Acraga goes is a moth of the family Dalceridae. It is found in Costa Rica, Ecuador, Venezuela, Trinidad, Guyana, Suriname, French Guiana, Colombia, Peru and Brazil. The habitat consists of tropical wet, tropical moist, tropical dry, tropical premontane wet, tropical premontane moist and subtropical dry forests.

The length of the forewings is 9–11 mm for males and 14–16 mm for females. Adults are entirely light yellow, the forewing slightly darker than the hindwings. The costal margin of the hindwings is lighter than rest of the hindwings. Adults are on wing year-round.

References

Dalceridae
Moths described in 1910